John Denman may refer to:
 John Denman (cricketer), English cricketer
 John Leopold Denman, English architect